Converse Lake is a  lake located on the border of Connecticut and New York in the United States. It is located in Conyers Farm, a gated community in Greenwich, Connecticut, not far from the Greenwich Polo Club.

References

Lakes of Fairfield County, Connecticut
Lakes of Westchester County, New York